Shelley Isabel Mann (October 15, 1937 – March 24, 2005) was an American competition swimmer and Olympic medalist at the 1956 Summer Olympics in Melbourne, Australia where she won the gold medal in the women's 100-meter butterfly event, and was a member of the U.S. team that won the silver medal for the women's 4×100-meter freestyle relay.

Mann was born in Long Island, New York in 1937 to Hamilton and Isabel Mann. Her father was in the U.S. Navy during World War II.

Mann caught polio at age six while living in Cambridge, Massachusetts. She spent weeks in the hospital and was left with a paralyzed right leg. She took up swimming to aid her recovery. She learned to walk but with a significant limp. She was a student at American University in Washington, D.C.

Career 
In the pool, her limp didn't matter and Mann began practicing and taking lessons from some of the top professional coaches.

She was a member of the Walter Reed Swim Club, and began competing. The swim team had to train at 6:00am because the Walter Reed medical hospital was needed for the patients. By the time she was 14 she had won the first of what would eventually be 24 AAU national championships in the freestyle, breaststroke, backstroke, butterfly, and individual medley events.

She was inducted into the International Swimming Hall of Fame as an "honor swimmer" in 1966, and the Virginia Sports Hall of Fame in 1984.

See also
 List of members of the International Swimming Hall of Fame
 List of American University people
 List of Olympic medalists in swimming (women)

References

External links
 
 Shelley Mann (USA) – Honor Swimmer profile at International Swimming Hall of Fame 
 Mention of Shelley Mann's death

1937 births
2005 deaths
American female butterfly swimmers
American female freestyle swimmers
American University alumni
Olympic gold medalists for the United States in swimming
Olympic silver medalists for the United States in swimming
Sportspeople from New York City
Swimmers at the 1955 Pan American Games
Swimmers at the 1956 Summer Olympics
Medalists at the 1956 Summer Olympics
Pan American Games bronze medalists for the United States
Pan American Games medalists in swimming
Medalists at the 1955 Pan American Games
20th-century American women
21st-century American women